Melvin Hammond may refer to:
 F. Melvin Hammond, Idaho politician and general authority of the Church of Jesus Christ of Latter-day Saints
 Melvin Ormond Hammond, Canadian journalist and photographer